Governor Powell may refer to:

Clifford Ross Powell (1893–1973), Acting Governor of New Jersey in 1935
George Gabriel Powell (1710–1779), Acting governor of St Helena from 1742 to 1748
Lazarus W. Powell (1812–1867), 19th Governor of Kentucky
Wesley Powell (1915–1981), 70th Governor of New Hampshire